Agathia diversiformis is a species of moth of the family Geometridae first described by William Warren in 1894. It is found in the north-eastern parts of the Himalayas.

References

Geometrinae
Moths of Asia